Ramadeva may refer to any of the following Indian kings:

 Ramabhadra (c. 833–836 CE), a king of the Gurjara-Pratihara dynasty
 Ramachandra of Devagiri (r. c. 1271-1311 CE), a king of the Seuna or Yadava dynasty
 Rama Deva Raya (r. c. 1617–1632 CE), a king of the Vijayanagara empire's Aravidu dynasty